Rothenberg Fortress is a fortress on the eponymous hill, 588 m, near Schnaittach in the Franconian Jura.

Beginnings 
The first fortifications were probably built between 1300 and 1330 by Dietrich von Wildenstein. He sold it in 1360 to the emperor and Bohemian king, Charles IV, who had the fort upgraded into a border castle in order to protect his Bohemian allodial estate.

Ganerbenburg 
In 1478, Count Palatine Otto II set the condition for Rothenberg Castle to become a joint-fief or Ganerbenburg. 44 co-vassals who, together with the town of Rothenberg and market town of Schnaittach, acquired the castle as a so-called mesne fief or Afterlehen, were given relatively little property and few rights, but the community of co-vassals formed a strong alliance to which other members of noble families in the area could be attached. The castle also had several rights of patronage in the Nuremberg area. The community of co-vassals had the characteristics of a type of union called an Einung. At the time of  Silvester von Schaumberg the castle was a "wasp's nest" - which even princes feared to fall out with.

The community of co-heirs nominated a burgrave.

 Heinz von Guttenberg, 1483
 Lamprecht von Seckendorff, called Rinhofen, 1487
 Hans Zollner von Rottenstein, 1487
 Dietz von Heßberg, 1488
 Jacob Stiebar zum Regensberg, 1494
 Konrad Schott von Schottenstein, 1497
 Albrecht Stiebar, 1499
 Christoff von Sparneck, 1502
 Albrecht Gotsmann, 1505
 Hans von der Thann, 1508
 Sixt von Seckendorff, 1509
 Sebastian Stiebar, 1512
 Hans Stiebar, 1537
 Wolf Adolf von Waldenfels, 1546
 Sigmund von Failtsch (Feilitzsch?), 1549
 Sebastian Erlbeck, 1553
 Hans Ludwig von Eyb, 1553
 Hans Ludwig von Schaumburg, 1569
 Balthasar von Seckendorff, 1580
 Hans von Steinau, 1585
 Georg Sebastian Stiebar, 1604
 Joachim Christoff von Seckendorff, 1610
 Wolff Endres Stiebar, 1617
 Sebastian von Rotenhan, 1618

Fortress 
In the 18th century an important Rococo fortress, based on a French prototype, was built on the site by the Elector of Bavaria and German Emperor, Charles VII. Construction lasted from about 1729 to 1750. Two bastions were named after him and his wife, Maria Amalia. From time to time up to 400 soldiers were garrisoned here. It was built on an older and smaller fortification that was slighted, which in turn had been built on the remains of an even older ruined castle.

The site was built to geometric principles. Because they wanted to avoid blind spots, bastions were built to a star-shaped design. The overall plan was a polygon with a bastioned tower at each corner. The crest of the embankment was kept low in order to minimise the target area. The outer defences on the north side began with a gently rising glacis, followed by a covered way and a moat. Behind that, and scarcely higher than the glacis, rose the main rampart. This was designed to be difficult to shell because the wall was protected by the glacis. 
The site of the fortress on a hill ridge resembled that of medieval castles, that were often built on high points that were very difficult to access. In this case, the hillside thus protected the fortress to the south, east and west from being stormed, but not from the powerful siege guns of that time.

The fortress was built entirely of brickwork. This was sixteen metres high on all sides and had vaulting on the inside, ten metres high. 

There were two, two-storey barrack buildings inside the fortress, an armoury, the garrison headquarters and a church. The garrison lived in the fortress with their families. Protected water supplies came from a fortress well and, later, by the Schneckenbrunnen well, built in 1759-67, in the counterguard outside the fortress.

Built to counter the imperial city of Nuremberg only 25 kilometres away, the fortress was intended to guard the Bavarian border and the Electoral Bavarian enclave near Schnaittach from the city.

In 1806 Napoleon annexed Franconia to the Kingdom of Bavaria and Rothenberg then became superfluous to the Bavarian Army as a border fortress. It continued to be used, however, as a fortress prison.

In 1838 the Bavarian Minister of War sold the entire inventory, including doors, beams and everything that could be removed. The fortress was abandoned and fell into ruins. It was used as a quarry for the construction of Nuremberg Central Station. 
In 1876 explosive demolition testing was carried out on the ravelin.

The site may be visited as part of a guided tour. The underground casemates are out of bounds from November to April in order protect bats.

Southward of the ruins you can find a cemetery. 1083 people were buried on this place.

Literature 
Johannes Müllner: Die Annalen der Reichsstadt Nürnberg von 1623, Teil II: Von 1351–1469. Nuremberg, 1972. pp. 30–35.
Martin Schütz: Die Ganerbschaft Rothenberg. Nuremberg, 1924.
Sven Thole: Die Festung Rothenberg - Der Festungsbau im 18. Jahrhundert, Maßnahmen der Erhaltung und Möglichkeiten der Konservierung. Dissertation, University of Bamberg, 2007 (full text)
August Wörler: Veste und Festung Rothenberg. Heimat- und Geschichtsverein Neunkirchen am Sand, Neunkirchen am Sand, 2008

External links

References 

Castles in Bavaria
Nürnberger Land
Forts in Germany
Charles VII, Holy Roman Emperor